The 2018–19 South West Peninsula League season was the twelfth in the history of the South West Peninsula League, a football competition in England, that feeds the Premier Division of the Western Football League. The league had been formed in 2007 from the merger of the Devon County League and the South Western League, and is restricted to clubs based in Cornwall and Devon. The Premier Division of the South West Peninsula League is on the same level of the National League System as the Western League Division One (Step 6).

The constitution was announced on 25 May 2018. At the end of this season, significant restructuring of the league was to take place. With this in mind, it was decided not to transfer clubs between Division One East and Division One West just for one season, solely in order to balance the numbers in each division for this season.

For 2019–20, the league will consist of two Step 6 divisions of twenty clubs each. These two divisions will be made up of the 2018–19 Step 6 (Premier Division) clubs, plus others promoted from Step 7 and below. There will be two new Step 7 leagues below the South West Peninsula League in 2019–20, the Devon League and the St Piran League.

Premier Division

The Premier Division featured 20 teams, the same as the previous season, after Plymouth Parkway were promoted to the Western League Premier Division, and Stoke Gabriel were demoted to Division One East. 

Two new clubs joined the league:
Elburton Villa, promoted from Division One West.
Millbrook, promoted from Division One West.
Reserve sides are not eligible for promotion to Step 5.

Witheridge withdrew from the league on 7 August, before any matches had been played. They joined the Devon League at the start of the 2019–20 season.

At the end of the season, any clubs not promoted to Step 5 or taking voluntary relegation to Step 7 were placed in one of the two Step 6 divisions for 2019–20, except Plymouth Argyle Reserves, who did not apply to stay at Step 6. A Plymouth Argyle Development side joined the Devon League at the start of the 2019–20 season.

League table

Division One East
Division One East featured 19 clubs, increased from 18 the previous season, after Totnes & Dartington and Galmpton & Roselands resigned from the league, and three new clubs joined:

Elmore, promoted from the Devon and Exeter League.
Stoke Gabriel, demoted from the Premier Division due to ground grading failure.
Waldon Athletic, promoted from the South Devon League.

All clubs applied for promotion to Step 6 next season except: Alphington, Budleigh Salterton, Liverton United, St Martins, Teignmouth, University of Exeter and Waldon Athletic. The remainder were promoted to Step 6.

Torridgeside must secure full planning for ground grading G by 31 March 2020, or face demotion at the end of 2019–20.

Brixham, Honiton, Stoke Gabriel and Torridgeside must install floodlights by 31 March 2021, or face demotion at the end of 2020–21.

League table

Division One West
Division One West featured 15 clubs, reduced from 18 the previous season, after Millbrook and Elburton Villa were promoted to the Premier Division, Illogan RBL were relegated, and Penryn Athletic left the league. One new club joined:

Bere Alston United, promoted from the East Cornwall League.

All clubs applied for promotion to Step 6 next season except: Bere Alston United, Bude Town, Ludgvan and Plymstock United. The remainder were promoted to Step 6.

Dobwalls, Mousehole, St Dennis and Wendron United must install floodlights by 31 March 2021, or face demotion at the end of 2020–21.

League table

Other applicants for Step 6
Two other clubs from outside the league applied for Step 6 status for 2019–20. They are Dartmouth of the South Devon League, and Torrington of the North Devon League. Both were accepted for promotion to the Premier East.

References

External links
 South West Peninsula League

South West Peninsula League
10